Third base can mean:
 Third baseman in baseball
 Slang for intimate contact, a baseball metaphor for sex
 Third Base, a 1978 Japanese-language film directed by Yoichi Higashi

See also
 3rd Bass — an old school rap group, active from 1987 to 1992.

 Ryan Day (American football)